Some arachnids may be used for human consumption (edible arachnids), either whole or as an ingredient in processed food products such as cheese (Milbenkäse). Arachnids include spiders, scorpions, and mites (including ticks).

Spiders 

About 15 species of spiders are scientifically described as being edible, with a history of human consumption. These edible spiders include:
 Thailand zebra leg tarantula (Cyriopagopus albostriatus) which is sold fried as traditional snack in Cambodia and Thailand;
 Thailand Black (Cyriopagopus minax);
 Goliath birdeater (Theraphosa blondi);
 several other species of tarantula;
 the golden orb-weaving spider (Trichonephila edulis) that is eaten in New Caledonia and is said to taste like pâté.

Scorpions 

Fried scorpion is traditionally eaten in Shandong, China.

Mites 

Milbenkäse (mite cheese) is a German speciality cheese.

Mimolette is a mite cheese traditionally produced around the city of Lille, France.

Cheese mites could cause an allergic reaction if consumed in large quantities (above the standard of six mites per cubic inch).

Processing 
Typical processing of arachnids as food includes heating, defanging and, in certain cases, drying and grinding.

Footnotes

External links

!